The Type IX U-boat was designed by Nazi Germany's Kriegsmarine in 1935 and 1936 as a large ocean-going submarine for sustained operations far from the home support facilities. Type IX boats were briefly used for patrols off the eastern United States in an attempt to disrupt the stream of troops and supplies bound for Europe. It was derived from the Type IA, and appeared in various sub-types.

Type IXs had six torpedo tubes; four at the bow and two at the stern. They carried six reloads internally and had five external torpedo containers (three at the stern and two at the bow) which stored ten additional torpedoes. The total of 22 torpedoes allowed U-boat commanders to follow a convoy and strike night after night. Some of the IXC boats were fitted for mine operations; as mine-layers they could carry 44 TMA or 66 TMB mines.

Secondary armament was provided by one  deck gun with 180 rounds. Anti-aircraft armament differed throughout the war. They had two periscopes in the tower. Types IXA and IXB had an additional periscope in the control room, which was removed in Type IXC and afterward.
These long range boats were frequently equipped with Focke-Achgelis Fa 330 rotor kite towed rotary-wing aircraft.

Type IXA

List of Type IXA submarines
DeSchiMAG AG Weser of Bremen built eight Type IXA U-boats.

 - scuttled 8 May 1945
 - scuttled 5 May 1945
 - sunk  14 September 1939
 - sunk on 13 October 1939 by a mine
- sunk by depth charges on 5 February 1940
 - sunk on 13 October 1939 by depth charges
 - sunk on 30 July 1943
 - sunk  by mine on 13 March 1940

Type IXB

Type IXB was an improved model with an increased range. It was the most successful version overall with each boat averaging a total of over  sunk.

Notable IXB boats included  commanded by Reinhard Hardegen, which opened up the attack in the US waters in early 1942 known as Operation Drumbeat, and  operating off Freetown, Sierra Leone under the command of Günter Hessler, which had the most successful single mission of the war ever with close to  sunk.

List of Type IXB submarines
DeSchiMAG AG Weser of Bremen built 14 Type IXB U-boats. Thirteen were sunk in the course of the war.

Type IXC

The Type IXC was a further refinement of the class with storage for an additional 43 tonnes of fuel, increasing the boat's range. This series omitted the control room periscope leaving the boats with two tower scopes.

As mine-layers they could carry 44 TMA or 66 TMB mines, though the 35 boats of  through  and  through  were not fitted for mine operations.

The only U-boat sunk in the Gulf of Mexico, was a Type IXC.

U-505 survives at the Museum of Science and Industry in Chicago, and was completely renovated after being moved in 2004 to a purpose-built indoor berth.

List of Type IXC submarines
DeSchiMAG AG Weser and Seebeckwerft of Bremen, and Deutsche Werft of Hamburg built 54 Type IXC submarines. Only four survived the war, one of which is preserved in the US.

  - Sunk 6 May 1944 
  - Sunk 16 July 1943
  - Sunk 10 April 1944 
  - Sunk, 6 May 1943
  - Sunk by aircraft 3 June 1943
  - Sunk, 15 December 1941
  - Sunk by aircraft and surface ships, 17 May 1943
  - taken out of service 4 July 1944
  - sunk 12 March 1943 
  - Scuttled 17 December 1941
  - sunk by ship in July 1942
  - sunk 3 July 1944
  - scuttled post war by British
  - Sunk 8 March 1943
  - Sunk 13 June 1942
  - Sunk 30 June 1942
  - Sunk 28 July 1943
  - Sunk 14 July 1943
  - Sunk 27 September 1943
  - Sunk 3 September 1942
 - Sunk 12/13 March 1943
  - Sunk 6 January 1943
  - Sunk 27 September 1942
  -  sunk on 30 July 1942
  - Sunk by mine 9 October 1942 
  - Sunk, 13 December 1943
  - sunk 16 November 1942
  - sunk by aircraft 27 April 1943
  - sunk, 17 April 1943
  - sunk by Cuban Navy, 15 May 1943
  - Sunk by escorts, 10 September 1941
  - Sunk by aircraft 6 July 1942
  - Sunk, 15 March 1942
  - Sunk, 30 July 1943
  - Captured by US Navy, 4 June 1944. Preserved in museum
  - Sunk by aircraft 12 July 1943
  - Sunk by aircraft 13 January 1943
  - Sunk by aircraft 12 November 1943
  - Sunk by aircraft 15 July 1943
  - given to French Navy post war
  - transferred to Japan on 16 September 1943 
  - Sunk by aircraft 2 October 1942
  - Sunk by aircraft 19 July 1943
  - Sunk 8 July 1943
  - Sunk, 9 April 1944
  - scuttled post war by British
  - Sunk by aircraft 21 November 1942
  - Sunk, 22 April 1944
  - Posted missing 31 January 1943
  - Sunk, 30 October 1942
  - Sunk 2 June 1943
  - Sunk 23 February 1943
  - Sunk, 25 August 1943
  - Sunk on 22 March 1943 by aircraft

Type IXC/40

Type IXC/40 was an improved Type IXC with slightly increased range and surfaced speed.

List of Type IXC/40 submarines
DeSchiMAG AG Weser and Seebeckwerft of Bremen, and Deutsche Werft of Hamburg, built 87 of this type.

Type IXD

Type IXD was significantly longer and heavier than the IXC/40. It was faster than the IXC but at the cost of slightly reduced maneuverability. They had three pairs of Daimler Benz diesels: two pairs for cruise and one for high speed or battery recharge. There were three variants: the IXD1, IXD2 and IXD/42. The IXD1 had unreliable engines and they were later converted for use in surface transport vessels.
The IXD/42, was almost identical but with more engine power ( instead of ). 
 
In 1943 and 1944 the torpedo tubes were removed from a number of IXD boats converted for transport use. In their new role they could transport 252 tonnes of cargo.

List of Type IXD submarines
DeSchiMAG AG Weser of Bremen built 30 Type IXD U-boats.

 
 
 
 
 
 
 
 
 
 
 
 
 
 
 
 
 
 
 
 
 
 
 
 
 
 
 
 
 
 

Several Type IXD/42 U-boats were contracted to be built by DeSchiMAG AG Weser of Bremen, but only two were commissioned. They were:
 was launched on 28 April 1944 and commissioned 27 March 1945. Her career ended in Operation Deadlight.
 was launched on 17 May 1944 but was badly damaged on 30 March 1945 by US bombs while still in the dockyard.

References

Bibliography

External links

 
Submarine classes
World War II submarines of Germany